The Last Detective is a British TV comedy drama series, broadcast on ITV between 7 February 2003 and 31 May 2007, starring Peter Davison as the title character, Detective Constable "Dangerous Davies". The series is based on the "Dangerous Davies" series of novels written by Leslie Thomas, and was filmed in the north London suburbs of Willesden, Neasden and Harlesden. The gentle but engrossing nature of the series was in stark contrast to other hard-hitting police dramas of the time, but this appeared to be a winning formula, becoming a surprise rating success.

The first series aired in 2003, with three more series following it. The first, second and third series all consist of four 70-minute episodes (90-minutes with advertisements). The fourth series is slightly longer, encompassing five episodes in the series. After a total of seventeen episodes, production company Meridian Broadcasting (later Granada Productions), who produced the programme, stated that the series had been axed due to falling viewing figures, and that the fourth series would be the last.

The Granada series was not the first time that the title character had appeared on television. He previously appeared in a TV movie, first broadcast on 4 January 1981, starring Bernard Cribbins.

Background
The series follows Detective Constable "Dangerous" Davies. Davies discovered a crime committed by a fellow officer at the opening of the series, and is treated as a pariah by his colleagues as a consequence. Moreover, he is committed to his work and is staunchly humane, leading to a view of his being soft by colleagues, and a degree of grudging respect from local criminals. Recurring themes include Davies solving the apparently minor crimes he is given, often resolving more complex and associated crimes (historical or contemporary), and Davies repeatedly being the target of practical jokes by younger but more well positioned detectives in his unit.

As the series progresses his reputation improves with his superior, Detective Inspector (DI) Aspinall, who realises that Davies' intelligence and fair but determined methods make him the best policeman in his squad. A strained mutual respect develops between the two characters as Davies increasingly finds the time to try to understand the troubled, hard drinking DI and his history (and demons).

The other major aspect of the series concerns Davies' private life, which centres on his estranged wife, Julie (played by Emma Amos). The storyline regularly integrates Davies' attempts to address the loss of his wife's respect and to repair the damage done to their marriage after his career stalls in the Metropolitan Police Force; for instance, the estranged character returns to pick up a dog whose custody he shares with Julie (see below), to serve as her occasional chauffeur, and to carry out routine household maintenance at the family home (occasionally intersecting with Julie's new relationship interests).

His work and personal life intertwine in interactions with his friend, the irreverent and rather feckless Mod (short for Modesty) Lewis, played by the Irish comedian Sean Hughes, which include their park bench talks about cases and life, Davies' chauffeuring the unlicensed Mod, and Davies' walking his dog—an unnamed, but consistent character, a Landseer in early episodes, and later a St Bernard. Other recurring plot elements are the now "semi-detached" Davies' interactions with various female characters, episode by episode, and his relationship with Mrs Fulljames (Elizabeth Bennett), the romantic daydreaming landlady of the Bali-Hai Guest House, where he resides for a period.

Cast
 Peter Davison as "Dangerous" Davies; detective constable
 Sean Hughes as Modesty "Mod" Lewis; Davies' best friend
 Emma Amos as Julie Davies; Davies' wife
 Rob Spendlove as Ray Aspinall; detective inspector
 Charles De'Ath as Phillip Pimlott; detective sergeant
 Billy Geraghty as Darren Barrett; detective constable
 Colin McLachlan as Timothy Stone; police sergeant (Series 1–2)
 Michele Austin as Cheryl Holmes; WPC (Series 1)
 Natasha Williams as Yvonne Clarke; WPC (Series 2)
 Vineeta Rishi as Maya "Zsa Zsa" Kapoor; WPC (Series 3–4)
 Elizabeth Bennett as Mrs. Dorothy Fulljames; Davies' landlady (Series 1–2, 4)

Series overview

Episodes

Series 1 (2003)

Series 2 (2004)

Series 3 (2005)

Series 4 (2007)

Home media 
The Last Detective: Complete Collection was released on Region 1 DVD on 20 January 2009 and includes all 17 episodes of the TV show, the earlier TV movie, and other features including an interview with Peter Davison.
The DVD set is distributed by Acorn Media UK.

Further reading
 Robert Lloyd, 2009, "What You're Watching, DVD reviews: 'George Gently' and 'The Last Detective,'" LA Times (online), 18 February 2009, see, accessed 30 December 2018.
 Lars Walker, 2012, "Netflix Review: 'The Last Detective,'" Brandywine Books (online), 30 October 2012, see , accessed 27 May 2015.
 Lawrence Russell, 2007, "The Last Detective," Culture Court (online), August 2007, see, accessed 27 May 2015.

References

External links
1981 film: 
TV series: 

2003 British television series debuts
2007 British television series endings
2000s British drama television series
2000s British comedy-drama television series
ITV television dramas
Television series by ITV Studios
2000s British crime television series
Television shows produced by Meridian Broadcasting
English-language television shows
Detective television series